Sayantan Das (born 08 April 1997) is a chess player from Kolkata, who won the World Youth Chess Championship (boys) in 2008 which was held at Vietnam. He is a student at the Goodricke National Chess Academy at Kolkata, which has also produced the present under-10 Asian champion, Diptayan Ghosh. He studies in the Scottish Church Collegiate School in North Kolkata.

International Master Saptarshi Roy has coached him.

Sayantan Das on 4 July 2014 won maiden grand master title

References

External links

Living people
Indian chess players
World Youth Chess Champions
People from Kolkata
1997 births
Scottish Church Collegiate School alumni